The Ven. Liscombe Clarke was an  Anglican priest: the Archdeacon of Sarum from 1827 until 1836.

Clarke was educated at Winchester College and New College, Oxford. He was the incumbent at Downton and Biddestone, both in Wiltshire.

References

Alumni of New College, Oxford
People educated at Winchester College
Archdeacons of Sarum